The fifth season (2018–2019) of the Turkish TV series, Diriliş: Ertuğrul, created by Mehmet Bozdağ succeeds the fourth season of Diriliş: Ertuğrul and precedes the  first of Kuruluş: Osman.

Plot
After 10 years in Söğüt, in a Mongol-controlled Selçuk state, Ertuğrul faces many Mongol commanders including Alıncak and Subutai, along with the Selçuk assassin working with the Mongols, Beybolat. Beybolat is disguised with the name, Albastı who is a brother of İlbilge hatun and he arrives following the death of his father, Umur Bey, Bey of the Umuroğlu tribe, who was sent to become the new tax collecter of Söğüt. Umur Bey was killed by the disgraced Byzantine commander, Dragos, disguised as the Söğüt Zangoç, who seeks to take over the town. Beybolat, who becomes his father's successor, and Dragos, who takes control over Lefke Castle after killing the innocent Tekfur Yannis, cause many problems for Ertuğrul including Beybolat's control over Söğüt for a while. İlbilge, Beybolat's sister, is the only person in her family supporting justice. With her help, Ertuğrul, defeats and kills both Beybolat and Dragos. Following Beybolat's death, Ertuğrul faces Arikbuka, a feared Mongol spy and Alıncak's blood brother, along with the spy, Qiyat, who works for Hulagu against Berke, Ertuğrul's ally and the Han of the Golden Horde. The season ends with the death of Arikbuka and Qiyat along with Ertuğrul's marriage to İlbilge Hatun.

Cast

Main characters 

 Engin Altan Düzyatan as Ertuğrul Bey
 Ali Ersan Duru as Beybolat Bey/Albastı
 Hülya Darcan as Hayme Ana
 Hande Soral as İlbilge Hatun
 İlker Aksum as Komutan Dragos (disguised as Zangoç)
 Cengiz Coşkun as Turgut Alp
 Nurettin Sönmez as Bamsı Beyrek

Supporting characters 
 Didem Balçın as Selcan Hatun
 Kaan Taşaner as Gündoğdu Bey
 Ayberk Pekcan as Artuk Bey
 Celal Al as Abdurrahman Alp
 Engin Benli as Alıncak
 Arif Diren as Gündüz Alp
 Rümeysa Arslan as Prensesi İrene
 Emre Üçtepe as Osman Bey
  as Hafsa Hatun
 Ali Buhara Mete as Mergen
 Uğur Karabulut as Uranos
 Öykü Çelik as Sırma Hatun
 Ali Savaşcı as Emir Bahattin
 Emre Erçil as Arikbuka

Minor characters
 Edip Zeydan as Dumrul Alp
 Hakan Serim as Günkut Alp
 Dursun Ali Erzincanlı as the Imam of Söğüt
 Kerem Bekişoğlu as Savcı Bey
 Orçun Iynemli as Mikis
 Alper Yaman as Çağrı
 Koray Şahinbaş as Tara
 Halit Özgür Sarı as Süleyman Alp
 Melikşah Özen as Melikşah Alp
 Şafak Baskaya as Yınal Alp
 Ayşun Demir as İlçin Hatun
 Esra Balıkci as Mengü Hatun
 Çağla Naz Kargı as Aslıhan Hatun (Bamsı's daughter)
 Enes Göçmen as Aybars Bey
 Armagan Oguz as Ataç Bey
 Aytek Sayan as Komutan Lais
 Enis Yıldız as Tekfur Yannis

Guest characters 
 Serdar Gökhan as Süleyman Şah
 Ozman Sirgood as İbn-i Arabi (voice only)
 Ünal Silver as Umur Bey
 Mertcan Tekin as Sultan İzzeddin Keykavus
 Süleyman Karaahmet as Berke Han

Episodes

References

External links 
 

Diriliş: Ertuğrul and Kuruluş: Osman
2018 television seasons